ZeroZone is a graphic adventure game in which the player assumes the position of a character who must unravel the truth about his father's death.

Plot 
Players play as Stan Gonzo, who receives a will from his father, whom he has never before met. Stan assumes his role as leader of the largest cyber technology company, the Kanary, and tries to unravel how his dad died, who he was, and what to do next.

The game starts when Stan is already sitting in his office in the Kanary where a police officer asks if he has any information to further the investigation into his father's murder.

Stan's own investigation starts by looking around the Kanary and meeting the rest of his family.

Gameplay 
Players move around the ZeroZone world through a semi-3D interface, that lets players look 360 degrees around with panorama like scenery. Players move around by clicking a section of the panorama image, to go to another semi-3D panorama scene; the game advances in the same style.

Game obstacles are mainly solving puzzles, find clues and talking and interacting with other people. Some 1st person shooting action comes around every now and then, but this is more to further the plot than true fighting.

The ZeroZone virtual world is quite large, with many places to visit. Players can communicate with almost all people in the game, often they reveal clues or give hints on what to do next.

Reception 
When the game was released, it was criticised for having low quality graphics. Yet some say the plot and music created the right setting for enjoyment. Another noticeable drawback is the seemingly buggy code, which can make the game crash for no apparent reason.

1998 video games
Adventure games
Cryo Interactive games
Cyberpunk video games
Europe-exclusive video games
Video games developed in France
Windows games
Windows-only games